Air Marshal Mohammed Azim Daudpota (:14 September 1933 – 3 April 2017;), commonly known as Azim Daudpota, was the first Sindhi pilot in Pakistan Air Force and the first Sindhi to receive the Sitara-e-Jurrat (Star of Bravery) Award. 

He was a three-star officer in the Pakistan Air Force who went on to serve as the Chief of Air Staff of Air Force of Zimbabwe, and then to briefly serve as Governor of Sindh.

Early life
Azim Daudpota was born on 14 September 1933 in Bombay (now called Mumbai), British India. His father, Umar Bin Muhammad Daudpota, was a Sindhi research scholar, linguist and a historian of the Indus valley. After his basic education at St. Patrick's High School, Karachi, he completed his college education at D. J. Sindh Government Science College, Karachi in 1951.

Air force career
Daudpota joined the Pakistan Air Force Academy in 1951. The following year, he commenced a course of training at Royal Australian Air Force Academy from where he graduated in 1955.  After service as a pilot and then as Squadron Commander of numbers 15 and 17; he attended the PAF Staff College before serving on the staff of the Pakistani High Commission in New Delhi. After a further period of training at the Royal College of Defence Studies in London, Daudpota commanded PAF Bases Rafiqui and Sargodha.

Chief of Zimbabwe Air Force
In 1983 the Zimbabweans sought assistance from Pakistan as they wanted to replace the former Rhodesian officer who then headed the Air Force of Zimbabwe.  Daudpota was selected and served as Commander of the Air Force of Zimbabwe from July 1983 to January 1986.

Civilian work
On his return to Pakistan, Daudpota became the Managing Director and Chairman Of Pakistan International Airlines from January 1986 to April 1990.

He became the Chairman of Pakistan Industrial Development Corporation. He joined Kashmir Corporation as an Executive Director in April 1990; from 25 October 1999 to 24 May 2000, Daudpota also became the Governor of Sindh (1999 - 2000).

At the time of his death, he was the chairman of the board at MacPac Films Limited, a company that makes raw material for packaging.

Honours and recognition
Sitara-e-Jurat (Star of Courage) Award by the President of Pakistan in 1965 War against India.
Sitara-e-Imtiaz (Star of Excellence) Award by the President of Pakistan.
Hilal-e-Imtiaz (Crescent of Excellence) by the President of Pakistan.
Order of Merit by the President of Zimbabwe in 1986.

Death
Azim Daudpota died on 3 April 2017 in Karachi at age 83 after battling a number of illnesses and died of cardiac arrest. He was buried at Pakistan Air Force's Faisal Airbase graveyard in Karachi.

Awards and decorations

Foreign Decorations

References

External links
Dawn.com - The educated of Sindh - Air Marshal Azim Daudpoto

 

|-

 

|-

 

1933 births
2017 deaths
D. J. Sindh Government Science College alumni
St. Patrick's High School, Karachi alumni
Pakistan Air Force air marshals
Air Force of Zimbabwe
Pakistan Hockey Federation presidents
Pakistani expatriates in Zimbabwe
Pakistan International Airlines people
Military personnel from Mumbai
Pakistani expatriates in Australia
Recipients of Sitara-e-Jurat
Recipients of Sitara-i-Imtiaz
Recipients of Hilal-i-Imtiaz